Lady Naomi Anna Gordon-Lennox (born March 1962), known as Nimmy March, is an English actress.

Background
March's biological parents were a black South African father from Lesotho and a white English mother. As an illegitimate child, she was abandoned by her birth mother.

She was adopted by the Earl and Countess of March and Kinrara, who later became the Duke and Duchess of Richmond. Because of her race, the adoption caused a stir within the peerage and the future Duke and Duchess were vilified by some for "sullying the aristocracy", as March herself described it.

She went to Bedales, an exclusive Hampshire school, before going on to drama school.

Career
March's television screen credits include Coronation Street, Albion Market, Common As Muck, Goodnight Sweetheart, Casualty, William and Mary, Doctors, Strictly Confidential, The Bill, London's Burning, Waking the Dead, Death in Paradise, Agatha Raisin and Emmerdale.

She narrated the 2008 TV serial Last Voices of World War 1 on the History Channel, along with the BBC1 documentary The War On Loan Sharks.

Personal life
Until 2004, children who were adopted by peers had no right to any noble or courtesy title. However, as a result of a Royal Warrant dated 30 April 2004, all children are now automatically entitled to the same styles and courtesy titles. Therefore, on that date, she became The Lady Naomi Gordon-Lennox.

She married Gavin Burke in 1999, but they subsequently divorced. They have three children:  Khaya (born 1999), Malachy (born 2001), and Carlotta (born 2005).

She has four siblings, including a sister who is also mixed-race. She is Buddhist and bisexual.

References

External links
 
 About Naomi "Nimmy" March, page re famous adoptions
 "Relative Values: The Duke of Richmond and Nimmy March" - Webpage of Times Online

1962 births
Living people
Actresses from Surrey
Bisexual actresses
Bisexual women
Black British actresses
Daughters of British dukes
English adoptees
English Buddhists
English television actresses
English people of South African descent
LGBT Black British people
LGBT Buddhists
LGBT nobility
People educated at Bedales School
People from Kingston upon Thames